Colleen Anne Fitzpatrick (5 January 1938 – 12 August 2017) was an Australian model, actress and filmmaker.

Biography
Fitzpatrick was born in Sydney, New South Wales, Australia of Irish descent.  A prominent international catwalk, television and photographic model from 1959 to 1972, Fitzpatrick appeared in over 200 commercials, on countless magazine covers, and was contracted for various campaigns including Ford cars, becoming famous for her comedic flair working with the likes of John Cleese.  Fitzpatrick trained as an actor with American Hayes Gordon at The Ensemble Studios of Sydney's Ensemble Theatre.  She was a company member of The Sydney Theatre Company, formerly The Old Tote Theatre Company from 1972 to 1974 including productions of 'King Lear', 'Threepenny Opera', 'Playboy of the Western World', 'Richard II', 'Macbeth' and David Williamson's 'What If You Died Tomorrow?' opening the Sydney Opera House in 1973.  Other theatre work includes 'Pride and Prejudice', 'The House of Bernarda Alba', 'In the Boom Boom Room', 'Crimes of the Heart' for the Ensemble Rep, and 'When in Rome' for the Ensemble Theatre.  Also ''night, Mother' and 'A Day in the Death of Joe Egg' for Belvoir St Theatre.

Film and television work includes lead roles in The Pleasure Girls made in 1965 about a model finding herself swept up in swinging sixties London also starring Klaus Kinski, Games for Parents and Other Children, A Girl's Own Story by Jane Campion, Rebel, starring Matt Dillon, the Bodyline (miniseries) as Donald Bradman's mother, Police Rescue, 12 episodes of Sons and Daughters (Australian TV series) as the evil Jean Hopkins, Home and Away, Outbreak of Hostilities, The Four Minute Mile, A Country Practice, Whipping Boy and Soldier Soldier. 

Fitzpatrick completed a Bachelor of Arts (communications) majoring in film at the University of Technology, Sydney (UTS).  Formerly married to actor Max Cullen from 1973 to 1987, they have one daughter, actress Katharine Cullen born 9 June 1975 and a grandson William Richards born 17 August 2013.

Fitzpatrick died peacefully on 12 August 2017 from Motor Neurone Disease.

References

1938 births
2017 deaths
20th-century Australian actresses
Australian female models
Models from Sydney